Central Wesleyan College was a private college sponsored by the Methodist Church in Warrenton, Missouri, from 1864 to 1941.

History

The college has its roots in the German and English College founded in 1854 in Quincy, Illinois, to train ministers for the German Methodist Episcopal Church.  The English portion closed in 1863 as descendants of German immigrants were more numerous and interested in continuing their church traditions.
  
Church members founded the new school in Warrenton with the stated purposes of providing homes for orphans of the American Civil War and to supply a "higher educational institute for the youth of the German Church in the West."  Founders purchased a  campus for the Western Orphan Asylum and Educational Institute.  In 1869, the name was changed to Central Wesleyan College and Orphan Asylum.  In 1884, the two organizations split: Central Wesleyan College and Central Wesleyan Orphan Home.

In 1909 the German College of Mount Pleasant, Iowa, merged with the college, which was renamed the Central Wesleyan College and German Theological Seminary.
In 1912 the college was among the original founders of the Missouri Intercollegiate Athletics Association.  After public universities took over the Mid-America athletic conference, in 1924 Central was among the founders of the Missouri College Athletic Union.

The records of Ozark Wesleyan College of Carthage, Missouri, were added to the Truman State University Library and Archives in the 1920s.

Junior college
It was reclassified as a junior college in 1930, awarding two-year degrees.

Closing 
Faced with financial troubles in the Great Depression, the college closed in 1941.  Its grounds were sold in 1946 at auction.  In 1947, Truman State University bought its records.

Notable alumni
Herb Hake - cartoonist
Carl Lutz (1895–1975), Swiss vice-consul to Hungary during WWII, credited with saving over 62,000 Jews
John Louis Nuelsen - Methodist Bishop
Leonidas C. Dyer - Congressman
John H. Hellweg - Wisconsin state legislator and businessman
Theodore W. Hukriede - Congressman
Henry F. Niedringhaus - Congressman
William A. Rodenberg - Congressman

References

 
Buildings and structures in Warren County, Missouri
Educational institutions established in 1864
1941 disestablishments in Missouri
1864 establishments in Missouri